Birger Stenman (9 October 1909 – 24 April 1989) was a Finnish gymnast. He competed in seven events at the 1928 Summer Olympics.

References

External links
 

1909 births
1989 deaths
Finnish male artistic gymnasts
Olympic gymnasts of Finland
Gymnasts at the 1928 Summer Olympics
Sportspeople from Vyborg
20th-century Finnish people